Bonito Oriental is a town, with a population of 10,320 (2020 calculation), and a municipality in the Honduran department of Colón.

The town of Bonito Oriental is the primary location of the novel The Mosquito Coast by Paul Theroux. While Theroux's book describes the town as being very remote and difficult to get to, it was actually located about one mile from a main paved highway at the time he wrote the book.

References 

Municipalities of the Colón Department (Honduras)